Caviana is a monotypic snout moth genus described by Herbert H. Neunzig and L. C. Dow in 1993. Its only species, Caviana fuscella, described in the same publication, is found in Belize.

References

Moths described in 1993
Phycitinae
Monotypic moth genera
Moths of Central America
Pyralidae genera